Vladislav Kubeš (born October 31, 1978) is a Czech professional ice hockey player. He played with BK Mladá Boleslav in the Czech Extraliga during the 2010–11 Czech Extraliga season.

References

External links

1978 births
Living people
BK Havlíčkův Brod players
BK Mladá Boleslav players
Czech ice hockey forwards
HC Berounští Medvědi players
HC Slavia Praha players
HC Vrchlabí players
IHC Písek players
People from Klatovy
Sportspeople from the Plzeň Region